Neritimorpha is a taxonomic grouping, an unranked major clade of snails, gastropod mollusks. This grouping includes land snails, sea snails, slugs, some deepwater limpets, and also freshwater snails. Neritimorpha contains around 2,000 extant species. Some Neritimorphs are commonly kept as pets.  This clade used to be known as the superorder Neritopsina.  

The clade Neritimorpha is, based on optimal phylogenetic analysis, deemed monophyletic.

Etymology

The clade’s name, Neritimorpha, is from the Ancient Greek νηρίτης (nērī́tēs 'Nerite') and μορφή (morphḗ 'form').

Geologic History and Evolution

Neritimorpha has an extremely rich geologic history, going back to early Ordovician. This clade has been considered to be a leftover of early gastropod diversification.

1997 taxonomy 
According to the taxonomy of the Gastropoda (Ponder & Lindberg, 1997) Neritopsina is a gastropod superorder in the subclass Orthogastropoda. The superfamily Palaeotrochoidea is contained within Neritopsina but its order placement is undetermined.

2005 taxonomy 
The taxonomy of the Gastropoda by Bouchet & Rocroi, 2005 categorizes Neritimorpha as a gastropod mollusk clade. It is one of the 6 highest clades in Gastropoda. It contains the clades Cyrtoneritimorpha, Cycloneritimorpha, as well as Paleozoic Neritimorpha of uncertain position.

Clades (and uncertain position taxa) in Neritimorpha include:

 † Paleozoic Neritimorpha of uncertain position
 † clade Cyrtoneritimorpha
 clade Cycloneritimorpha

Four extant superfamilies are recognised: Helicinoidea, Hydrocenoidea, Neritoidea and Neritopsoidea.

See also 
For a more detailed taxonomy of this group, please see Taxonomy of the Gastropoda (Bouchet & Rocroi, 2005)#Clade Neritimorpha (= Neritopsina)

References 

 
Protostome unranked clades